Cha Tae-sung (8 October 1934 – 18 November 2006) was a South Korean footballer who competed in the 1964 Summer Olympics.

Honours
ROK Army CIC
Korean National Championship: 1957, 1959
Korean President's Cup: 1956, 1957, 1959, 1961

Cheil Industries
Korean Semi-professional League (Spring): 1964

National Police Department
Korean Semi-professional League (Spring): 1966, 1967
Korean Semi-professional League (Autumn): 1966
Korean President's Cup runner-up: 1966

South Korea
AFC Asian Cup: 1956, 1960
Asian Games silver medal: 1958, 1962

Individual
AFC Asian All Stars: 1965, 1966

References

External links 
 
 
 Cha Tae-sung at KFA 

1934 births
Living people
South Korean footballers
Olympic footballers of South Korea
Footballers at the 1964 Summer Olympics
Asian Games medalists in football
Footballers at the 1958 Asian Games
Footballers at the 1962 Asian Games
Yonsei University alumni
Footballers from Seoul
AFC Asian Cup-winning players
1956 AFC Asian Cup players
1960 AFC Asian Cup players
Asian Games silver medalists for South Korea
Association football defenders
Medalists at the 1958 Asian Games